Marco Giambruno (born 4 December 1984) is an Italian footballer who plays as a goalkeeper for Como at Lega Pro Prima Divisione.

Career

Early career and Roma
Born in Palermo, Sicily, Giambruno started his career at Messina. In summer 2002, he was exchanged with Armando Guastella in co-ownership deal, both tagged for €2.5 million nominal value for 50% rights. He signed a 5-year contract. In June 2004, Roma gave up the remain rights of Guastella and Messina sold the remains rights of Giambruno to Roma for a fee of €70,000. It made Roma registered a financial income of €2.43 million for Giambruno and €2.5 million financial cost for Guastella, which in total a cost of €70,000.

Lega Pro clubs
In summer 2005, he was sold to Pisa in another co-ownership deal for just €500. In summer 2007, he left for Portogruaro. In March 2009, he signed for Pro Patria, as the backup of Luca Anania.

In 2009-10 season, he worked as Nicholas Caglioni's backup. Without a club for 1 season, in July 2011 he joined Calcio Como, replacing departed Paolo Castelli. Giambruno made his debut in the first round of 2011–12 Coppa Italia.

References

External links
 
 Profile at AIC.Football.it 
 

Italian footballers
A.C.R. Messina players
Pisa S.C. players
Aurora Pro Patria 1919 players
Como 1907 players
Association football goalkeepers
Footballers from Palermo
1984 births
Living people